Temple Beth-El is a Reform synagogue at 5 Old Mill Road in Great Neck, New York.  Founded in 1928, it is the oldest synagogue in Great Neck.

, it had a membership of 875 families. Since 2009, the senior rabbis have been a married couple: Meir and Tara Feldman. Their cantor is Adam Davis. Their cantor emerita is Lisa Hest.

History 
The temple was founded in 1928 when 86 organizing members began meeting at local church.  Rabbi David Goodis served as the congregation's first rabbi, but was in that role only briefly before he died in 1930.  His successor, Rabbi Jacob Phillip Rudin, served for four decades establishing the temple as one of the most prominent synagogues in the United States. The temple erected its original building on Old Mill Road in 1932. The temple began an adult study program that later became a Hebrew Union College-Jewish Institute of Religion extension program.  The building expanded in 1950, and again in 1970.  Rabbi Rudin retired in 1971; Rabbi Jerome Davidson, who had been assistant rabbi since 1958, took over and served as senior rabbi until 2007.   Rabbi Davidson's son, Rabbi Joshua Davidson, born in the Great Neck congregation, went on to lead Congregation Emanu-El of New York.

Some members of the congregation left in 1940 to form a Conservative synagogue, Temple Israel of Great Neck, which was led for many years by the prominent rabbi Mordecai Waxman. A Reform spinoff, Temple Emanuel of Great Neck, formed in 1953.

The original Temple building was enlarged three times during the past 60 years. It went through drastic renovation due to a fire that damaged some of the property. Since the fire, Temple Beth-El has continued to go through renovations.

In 1994 the congregation hired Karen Bender as an assistant rabbi.  Bender was openly lesbian, and when she and her life partner decided to celebrate a commitment ceremony in California, Davidson agreed to officiate at a blessing ceremony at Temple Beth-el.  Controversy within the congregation over this decision led to Davidson's well-publicized decision not only to continue to officiate for gay unions, but also to begin officiating at interfaith weddings and to push for the Reform rabbinate to pursue means of Jewish support for mixed marriages.

Temple Beth-El of Great Neck has a rich cantorial tradition. Cantors that have served at the temple include: John P. Hardt, Robert Harmon, Robert Bloch, and Barbara Ostfeld, the first woman to be ordained a cantor. Additionally,  Temple Beth-El of Great Neck's Early Childhood Education Center (led by Director Vicky Perler for 25 years) is one of the premiere pre-schools on the Northern Shore of Long Island. It is one of the few NAEYC-certified childhood centers in the area.

Prominent members
Sol Atlas (1907–1973), real estate developer
Oscar Brand (1920–2016) American-Canadian Singer 
Erica Groshen (1954–) Former Commissioner of Labor Statistics and head of the US Bureau of Labor Statistics
Andy Kaufman (1949–1984) Comedian and Actor 
Alfred J. Koeppel (1932–2001), real estate developer
Sidney Jacobson (businessman) (1918–2005), American businessman

References

External links

Official website

Great Neck Peninsula
Synagogues in Nassau County, New York
Reform synagogues in New York (state)
Jewish organizations established in 1928
Synagogues completed in 1932